Barbee Lake is a fresh water lake located in Warsaw, Indiana, United States.

The Barbee chain of lakes was formed by retreating glaciers during the Pleistocene era as were most of northeast Indiana's lakes.

Location

The lake chain
Barbee Lake is composed of seven interconnected and natural lakes (Barbee Lakes chain):
Barbee Lake 
Little Barbee Lake 
Kuhn Lake 
Irish Lake 
Sawmill Lake 
Sechrist Lake 
Banning Lake

Inflow and outflow
Inflow via Grassy Creek feeds Barbee (Big Barbee), Little Barbee, Irish, and Sawmill. Shoe Lake flows into Banning Lake while Heron Lake flows into Kuhn Lake. Banning and Kuhn Lakes have the best water quality in the chain because their small watersheds contribute fewer nutrients. Water leaving the Barbee chain heads north and feeds Tippecanoe Lake. Some 75% of the watershed is agricultural.

Residential
The chain of Barbee lakes has approximately 2,300 residences spread throughout the lakes with the highest concentration near Barbee's north end, Sechrist, and Little Barbee Lake.

Recreation
All of the lakes support bluegill, largemouth bass, yellow perch, catfish, and crappie. The Indiana Department of Natural Resources maintains a boat ramp on Kuhn Lake's north side. Access to Tippecanoe is possible for boats  and shorter in length through a manually operated lock.

References

Lake Lubbbers: Barbee
http://www.barbeelakes.org

Lakes of Indiana
Lakes of Kosciusko County, Indiana
Tourist attractions in Kosciusko County, Indiana